South Rockwood is a village in Monroe County in the U.S. state of Michigan. The population was 1,587 at the 2020 census. The village is located within Berlin Charter Township.

History
South Rockwood was founded in 1863 by John Strong, who named the community after Rockwood, Ontario.  The nearby community of Rockwood, Michigan was located just to the north and was settled a few years earlier.  Strong established the South Rockwood post office on July 5, 1877.  South Rockwood incorporated as a village in 1955.

Geography

The Huron River forms the northern boundary of the village and county line with the city of Rockwood in Wayne County.

Major highways
 runs south–north though the center of the village and is accessible via exit 26 (South Huron River Drive).

Demographics

2010 census
As of the census of 2010, there were 1,675 people, 687 households, and 453 families living in the village. The racial makeup of the village was 95.4% White, 2.3% African American, 0.2% Native American, 0.4% Asian, 0.4% from other races, and 1.3% from two or more races. Hispanic or Latino of any race were 4.1% of the population.

There were 687 households, of which 30.0% had children under the age of 18 living with them, 50.4% were married couples living together, 11.5% had a female householder with no husband present, 4.1% had a male householder with no wife present, and 34.1% were non-families. 25.6% of all households were made up of individuals, and 6.2% had someone living alone who was 65 years of age or older. The average household size was 2.44 and the average family size was 2.95.

The median age in the village was 38.9 years. 20.8% of residents were under the age of 18; 8.9% were between the ages of 18 and 24; 29% were from 25 to 44; 31.1% were from 45 to 64; and 10.1% were 65 years of age or older. The gender makeup of the village was 50.7% male and 49.3% female.

2000 census
As of the census of 2000, there were 1,284 people, 450 households, and 359 families living in the village. The racial makeup of the village was 97.59% White, 0.23% African American, 0.23% Native American, 0.08% Asian, 0.08% from other races, and 1.79% from two or more races. Hispanic or Latino of any race were 0.78% of the population.

There were 450 households, out of which 37.3% had children under the age of 18 living with them, 66.9% were married couples living together, 8.9% had a female householder with no husband present, and 20.2% were non-families. 14.9% of all households were made up of individuals, and 5.8% had someone living alone who was 65 years of age or older.  The average household size was 2.85 and the average family size was 3.18.

In the village, the population was spread out, with 26.6% under the age of 18, 9.0% from 18 to 24, 29.0% from 25 to 44, 26.3% from 45 to 64, and 9.0% who were 65 years of age or older.  The median age was 37 years. For every 100 females, there were 109.8 males.  For every 100 females age 18 and over, there were 102.6 males.

The median income for a household in the village was $62,500, and the median income for a family was $68,304. Males had a median income of $50,882 versus $27,813 for females. The per capita income for the village was $22,245.  About 2.3% of families and 4.1% of the population were below the poverty line, including 2.9% of those under age 18 and 4.8% of those age 65 or over.

Education
The village is served by Airport Community Schools.

References

Villages in Monroe County, Michigan
Villages in Michigan
Populated places established in 1863
1863 establishments in Michigan